Takyeh (also Romanized as Tekyeh; also known as Takia) is a village in Esfandan Rural District, in the Central District of Komijan County, Markazi Province, Iran. At the 2006 census, its population was 59, in 19 families.

References 

Populated places in Komijan County